Metridia pacifica is a copepod found in the north Pacific and surrounding waters.

Taxonomy
M. pacifica is most closely related to M. lucens; before being split by Brodsky based on morphological differences, these were considered to be the same species.

Description
M. pacifica has a clear body with a whitish tint.

Distribution
M. pacifica is found in the north Pacific and sub-Arctic waters. It can be found north as far as the southern Chukchi Sea. It is reported to be an expatriate in the Arctic Ocean.

Ecology

Life cycle and reproduction
M. pacifica has multiple broods. At Station P, for example, there are three cohorts: one in March, one in late June and July, and one in September to early October. It is likely that this is influenced by temperature; in one study, over 85% of nauplii were found below the thermocline from 14 June until 22 September, when it is warmer at the surface.

M. pacifica has an average generation time of three to four months at Station P.

References

Calanoida